In Christianity, an anchorite or anchoret (female: anchoress) is someone who, for religious reasons, withdraws from secular society so as to be able to lead an intensely prayer-oriented, ascetic, or Eucharist-focused life. While anchorites are frequently considered to be a type of hermit, unlike hermits they were required to take a vow of stability of place, opting for permanent enclosure in cells often attached to churches. Also unlike hermits, anchorites were subject to a religious rite of consecration that closely resembled the funeral rite, following which they would be considered dead to the world, a type of living saint. Anchorites had a certain autonomy, as they did not answer to any ecclesiastical authority other than the bishop.

The anchoritic life is one of the earliest forms of Christian monasticism. In the Catholic Church, eremitic life is one of the forms of the Consecrated life. In medieval England, the earliest recorded anchorites existed in the 11th century. Their highest number—around 200 anchorites—were recorded in the 13th century.

From the 12th to the 16th centuries, female anchorites consistently outnumbered their male counterparts, sometimes by as many as four to one (in the 13th century), dropping eventually to two to one (in the 15th century). The sex of a high number of anchorites, however, is not recorded for these periods.

Between 1536 and 1539, the dissolution of the monasteries ordered by Henry VIII of England effectively brought the anchorite tradition to an end.

Anchoritic life 
The anchoritic life became widespread during the early and high Middle Ages. Examples of the dwellings of anchorites and anchoresses survive, a large number of which are in England. They tended to be a simple cell (also called anchorhold), built against one of the walls of the local village church. In Germanic-speaking areas, from at least the tenth century, it was customary for the bishop to say The Office of the Dead as the anchorite entered their cell, to signify the anchorite's death to the world and rebirth to a spiritual life of solitary communion with God and the angels. Sometimes, if the anchorite was walled up inside the cell, the bishop would put his seal upon the wall to stamp it with his authority. Some anchorites, however, freely moved between their cells and the adjoining churches.

Most anchoritic strongholds were small, perhaps no more than  square, with three windows. Viewing the altar, hearing Mass, and receiving the Eucharist were possible through one small, shuttered window in the common wall facing the sanctuary, called a "hagioscope" or "squint". Anchorites provided spiritual advice and counsel to visitors through these windows, gaining a reputation for wisdom. Another small window allowed access to those who saw to the anchorite's physical needs. A third window, often facing the street but covered with translucent cloth, allowed light into the cell.

Anchorites committed to a life of uncompromising enclosure. Those who considered leaving perhaps believed their souls may be damned for spiritual dereliction. Some refused to leave their cells even when pirates or looters were pillaging their towns, and consequently burned to death when the church was torched. They ate frugal meals, spending their days both in contemplative prayer and interceding on behalf of others. Their body waste was managed by means of a chamber pot. Some anchorholds had a few small rooms, or attached gardens. Servants tended to the basic needs of anchorites, providing food and water, and removing waste. Julian of Norwich, for example, is known to have had several maidservants, among them Sara and Alice. Aelred of Rievaulx wrote an anchorite rule book, for his recluse sister, titled De Institutione Inclusarum; in it, he suggested keeping no housemates other than an old woman, to act as companion and doorkeeper, and a young maid as domestic servant.

In addition to being the physical location wherein the anchorite could embark on a journey toward union with God, the anchorhold also provided a spiritual and geographic focus for people from the wider society seeking spiritual advice and guidance. Though set apart from the community at large by stone walls and specific spiritual precepts, the anchorite lay at the very centre of the community. The anchorhold has been called a communal "womb" from which would emerge an idealized sense of a community's own reborn potential, both as Christians and as human subjects.

Influential texts 
An idea of their daily routine can be gleaned from an anchoritic rule. The most widely known today is the early 13th-century text known as Ancrene Wisse. Another, less widely known, example is the rule known as De Institutione Inclusarum written in the 12th century, around 1160–1162, by Aelred of Rievaulx for his sister. It is estimated that the daily set devotions detailed in Ancrene Wisse would take some four hours, on top of which anchoresses would listen to services in the church and engage in their own private prayers and devotional reading.

Richard Rolle, an English hermit and mystic, wrote one of the most influential guide books regarding the life of an anchoress. His book, The Form of Living, was addressed to a young anchoress named Margaret Kirkby, who was responsible for preserving his texts. Her connection to the town of Hampole has been commonly associated with Rolle; he is sometimes referred to as 'Richard Rolle of Hampole' despite a lack of conclusive evidence that Rolle indeed was ever in the small village.

Notable anchorites 

The earliest recorded anchorites lived in the third century AD. For example, Hilarion (Gaza, 291 – Cyprus, 371) was known as the founder of anchoritic life in Palestine.

The anchoritic life proved popular in England, where women outnumbered men in the ranks of the anchorites, especially in the 13th century. Written evidence supports the existence of 780 anchorites on 600 sites between 1100 and 1539, when the Dissolution of the Monasteries ordered by Henry VIII brought anchoritism in England to an end. However, the lack of a consistent registration system for anchorites suggests there may have been substantially more. English anchorholds can still be seen at Chester-le-Street in County Durham and at Hartlip in Kent.

 Bede records that prior to a conference in 602 with Augustine of Canterbury, British churchmen consulted an anchorite about whether to abandon their Celtic Christian traditions for the Roman practices Augustine was seeking to introduce.
 Toward the end of the seventh century, Guthlac of Crowland, related to the royal family of Mercia, withdrew from the monastery at Repton to an island in the Lincolnshire Fens, where he lived for some 15–20 years.
 Wulfric of Haselbury was enclosed as an anchorite in a cell built against the church in his village of Haselbury Plucknett.
 Christine Carpenter, who submitted a petition in 1329 and was granted permission to become the anchoress of Shere Church (also known as The Church of St. James) in the Borough of Guildford, received her food and drink through a metal grating on the outside wall. In the interior of the church, a quatrefoil through which she could receive the Eucharist and a hagioscope for her use for prayer and reflection were cut out of the wall. Although she left her cell, in 1332 she applied for—and was granted—permission to be re-enclosed.
 Katherine of Ledbury, anchorite at Ledbury, Herefordshire in the early 14th century.
 Margaret Kirkby (possibly 1322 to ), an anchoress at Hampole, for whom Richard Rolle wrote his vernacular guide The Form of Living.
 In 1346, an unnamed scribe translated Latin text to Welsh in what is today known as Book of the Anchorite of Llanddewibrefi (Jesus College, Oxford MS 119).
 Walter Hilton composed the first book of his Scale of Perfection for an unnamed enclosed woman.
 Julian of Norwich, whose writings left a lasting impression on Christian spirituality. Her cell, attached to St Julian's Church, Norwich, was destroyed during an air raid during World War II. The church itself was gutted, but the original walls remain, and it was rebuilt. On the site of the cell is a modern shrine to Julian.
 Nazarena of Jesus, née Julia Crotta, was an American who felt called to become an anchorite and entered the Camaldolese Abbey of Sant'Antimo in Rome in 1945, remaining there until her death in 1990.

Other anchorites included Calogerus the Anchorite and Cyriacus the Anchorite.

See also

Explanatory footnotes

Citations

General and cited references 
 "About Anchorites". Hermits & Anchorites of England, University of Exeter, 2010,.
 The Editors of Encyclopædia Britannica. "Great Chain of Being". Encyclopædia Britannica, Encyclopædia Britannica, Inc., 27 May 2015.
 Dixon, Alan. "The 'Great Chain of Being. Inner Civilization, 1 Jan. 1970.
 
 
 "Richard Rolle's Form of Living: A Medieval Guide for an Anchoress". Hermitary - the hermit, hermits, eremitism, solitude, silence, and simplicity, 2006.

Further reading
 
 
  
 Warren, Ann K. (1985). "Anchorites and their Patrons in Medieval England". Berkeley: University of California Press.

External links

Historical development 
 The Anchorhold at All Saints Church, King's Lynn, Norfolk
 Chapter 1 of The Rule of Saint Benedict re: Anchorites
 The Way of an Anchoress
 Anchorite Cell at St Luke's Church in Duston
 Marsha, Anchoritic Spirituality in Medieval England: The Form, the Substance, the Rule
 Rotha Mary Clay, Full Text plus illustrations, The Hermits and Anchorites of England.
 Introduction to the Ancrene Wisse
 anchorite? (anchorite.org, blog)
 Fully digitised copy of a British Library manuscript of the Ancrene Wisse, an influential rule for anchoresses written in the 13th century

Roman Catholic Church links 
 English tr. of canon 603 of The Code of Canon Law (1983) re: Anchorites as members of the Consecrated Life in the Catholic Church. Latin text of canon 603.

Christian monasticism
Christianity in the Middle Ages

cs:Poustevník
sv:Anakoret